Influence peddling is the practice of using one's influence in government or connections with authorities to obtain favours or preferential treatment for another, usually in return for payment. It is also called traffic of influence or trading in influence. Influence peddling per se is not necessarily illegal, as the Organisation for Economic Co-operation and Development (OECD) has often used the modified term "undue influence peddling" to refer to illegal acts of lobbying. However, influence peddling is typically associated with corruption and may therefore delegitimise democratic politics with the general public. It is punishable as a crime in Argentina, Belgium, Bulgaria, Brazil, France, Hungary, Italy, Portugal, Romania, Spain, and the United Kingdom.

:no:påvirkingshandel

Known cases 
In 2012 the vice president of Argentina Amado Boudou was accused of being a mere straw owner of the printing house Ciccone Calcográfica, a private company that has contracts to print over 120 million new Argentine pesos banknotes, license plates, and other government issues. The contracts were awarded by Boudou himself when he was the Economy Minister of Argentina. The scandal became known as Boudougate.
In April 2009, former Newfoundland politician Ed Byrne was convicted of influence peddling for his actions in the Constituency Allowance Scandal. He was the first of four politicians convicted in relation to the Scandal and the remaining politicians are on or awaiting trial.
As of December 2008, the Governor of Illinois, Rod Blagojevich was accused of influence peddling in attempting to sell the Senate seat vacated by President-elect Barack Obama.
Additionally, the mayor of Ottawa, Larry O'Brien, was brought to trial on similar grounds in May 2009. O'Brien was accused of purported influence peddling. On August 5, 2009, both charges were dismissed.

Nira Radia, an Indian woman still under investigation for using her connections with Indian politicians and members of the Indian media to tilt the auction of multi-million dollar licence contracts in favour of certain companies and individuals.
In 2014, former French President Nicolas Sarkozy was investigated due to alleged influence peddling.
 In April 2015 the Public Ministry of Brazil opened an investigation for influence peddling against the ex-president Luiz Inácio Lula da Silva. It was alleged that between 2011 and 2014 he lobbied for Odebrecht company to gain public procurements in foreign countries while also getting BNDES to finance those projects. Countries where this allegedly took place include Ghana, Angola, Cuba, and Dominican Republic.
 On 9 December 2016, the National Assembly impeached Park Geun-hye, President of South Korea from 2013 to 2017, on charges related to influence peddling by her top aide, Choi Soon-sil. Then-Prime Minister Hwang Kyo-ahn assumed her powers and duties as Acting President as a result. The Constitutional Court upheld the impeachment by a unanimous 8–0 ruling on 10 March 2017, thereby removing Park from office. On 6 April 2018, South Korean courts sentenced her to 24 years in prison which was later increased to 25 years. Park is currently imprisoned at Seoul Detention Center. In 2018, two separate criminal cases resulted in an increase of seven years in her prison sentence. She was found guilty of illegally taking off-the-book funds from the National Intelligence Service and given a five-year prison sentence, and also found guilty of illegally interfering in the Saenuri Party primaries in the 2016 South Korean legislative election, for which she was sentenced to two more years in prison.

References

P.Semeraro, Trading in influence and Lobbying in the Spanish criminal Code pag. 297.

See also
Bribery
Lobbying
Logrolling
Money trail - Money loop
Political corruption
Political finance
Pork barrel politics

Political corruption
Lobbying